The Flaming Forties is a 1924 American silent Western film, the sixth of seven features which short-lived motion picture company Stellar Productions released in 1924–1925 as Producers Distributing Corporation vehicles for Harry Carey. Carey was primarily known as a star of Westerns and only one of the seven films did not fit into that genre.  Assigned as director was 31-year-old Tom Forman, who less than two years later, in November 1926, died from a self-inflicted gunshot wound.

The film was based upon the 1869 Bret Harte story "Tennessee’s Pardner," which has also been filmed as Tennessee's Pardner (1916), The Golden Princess (1925), and Tennessee's Partner (1955).

Cast
 Harry Carey as Bill Jones
 William Norton Bailey as Desparde
 Jacqueline Gadsden as Sally
 James Mason as Jay Bird Charley
 Frank Norcross as Colonel Starbottle
 Wilbur Higby as the Sheriff

Preservation
With no prints of The Flaming Forties located in any film archives, it is a lost film.

See also
 Harry Carey filmography

References

External links

 
 

1926 films
1926 Western (genre) films
American black-and-white films
Films directed by Tom Forman
Producers Distributing Corporation films
Silent American Western (genre) films
1920s American films